Jaffa Cakes are a cake introduced by McVitie and Price in the UK in 1927 and named after Jaffa oranges. The most common form of Jaffa cakes are circular,  in diameter and have three layers: a Genoise sponge base, a layer of orange flavoured jam and a coating of chocolate. Each cake is 46 calories. Jaffa Cakes are also available as bars or in small packs, and in larger and smaller sizes. The original Jaffa Cakes now come in packs of 10, 20, 30, or 40, having been downsized in 2017 from 12 or 24 per pack.

Because McVitie's did not register the name "Jaffa Cakes" as a trademark, other biscuit manufacturers and supermarkets have made similar products under the same name. The product's classification as a cake or biscuit was part of a VAT tribunal in 1991, with the court finding in McVitie's favour that Jaffa Cakes should be considered cakes and not biscuits for tax purposes. In 2012 they were ranked the best selling cake or biscuit in the United Kingdom.

McVitie and Price's Jaffa Cakes

Manufacture
McVitie's entire line of Jaffa Cakes are produced at the McVitie's factory in Stockport. The Jaffa cake production area covers an acre and includes a production line over a mile long which sits on the Stockport side of the site's boundary with Manchester. Because of the nature of the product – having multiple components of cake, chocolate covering and jam – special hardware accelerators were devised to allow rapid computer inspection of 20 products per second, taking place under four symmetrically placed lights.

Flavour variants
Although Jaffa Cakes are usually orange flavour, limited edition flavours have been available, such as lemon-and-lime, strawberry and blackcurrant. McVities launched limited-edition pineapple flavour Jaffa Cakes in early 2020. In early 2021, McVitie's unveiled the new flavours cherry and passionfruit.

Legal status
In the United Kingdom, value added tax is payable on chocolate-covered biscuits, but not on chocolate-covered cakes. McVities defended its classification of Jaffa Cakes as cakes at a VAT tribunal in 1991, against the ruling that Jaffa cakes were biscuits due to their size and shape, and the fact that they were often eaten in place of biscuits. McVities insisted that the product was a cake, and produced a giant Jaffa Cake in court to illustrate its point.

The court discounted the expert evidence, as it went beyond the capacity of an ordinary purchaser.

The product was assessed on the following criteria:

 The product's name was regarded as a minor consideration.
 The ingredients were regarded as similar to those of a cake, producing a thin cake-like mixture rather than the thick dough of a biscuit.
 The product's texture was regarded as being that of a sponge cake.
 The product hardens when stale, in the manner of a cake.
 A substantial part of a Jaffa Cake, in terms of bulk and texture, is sponge.
 In size, a Jaffa Cake is more like a biscuit than a cake.
 The product was generally displayed for sale alongside other biscuits, rather than with cakes.
 The product is presented as a snack and eaten with the fingers, like a biscuit, rather than with a fork as a cake might be. The tribunal also considered that children would eat them in "a few mouthfuls", in the manner of a sweet.

The court was adjudicated by Mr Donald Potter QC, who found in favour of McVitie's and ruled that whilst Jaffa Cakes had characteristics of both cakes and biscuits, the product should be considered a cake, meaning that VAT is not paid on Jaffa Cakes in the United Kingdom. Mr Potter QC also expressed that Jaffa Cakes were not biscuits.

The Irish Revenue Commissioners also regard Jaffa Cakes as cakes, since their moisture content is greater than 12%. As a result, they are charged the reduced rate of VAT (13.5% ).

Advert 
During an advert first shown on TV on 26 February 2021, McVities reignited the debate of whether Jaffa Cakes were cakes or biscuits. The advert shows a man debating whether it is a cake or a biscuit and then coming to the conclusion that he can be anything he wants to be. The advert is part of a wider £4.7 million investment in Jaffa Cakes including social media partnerships, AR digital experiences and PR and influencer work. This is the first standalone Jaffa Cakes advert since 2006.

Other brands

 Mondelez brand Lefèvre-Utile (LU) produced Jaffa Cakes under the commercial name PiM's. The jam flavours include cherry, orange, pear, raspberry, lemon, chocolate mousse and hazelnuts, etc.
 Delicje Szampańskie are the Polish equivalent and had been manufactured by E. Wedel since 1977. , Delicje brand belongs to Mondelēz International, Inc.
 Jaffa Crvenka produces Jaffa Cakes in Serbia.

References

External links

British cakes
United Biscuits brands
Brand name snack foods
Products introduced in 1927